Catholic Earthcare Australia is an agency of the Australian Catholic Bishops Conference and is the environmental arm of the Catholic Church in Australia. This executive agency of the Bishops' Commission for Justice and Development (BCJD) is mandated with the mission of advising, supporting and assisting the BCJD in responding to Pope John Paul II's call to "stimulate and sustain the ecological conversion" throughout the Catholic church in Australia and beyond.

In May 2017, the Australian Catholic Bishops Conference decided to incorporate Catholic Earthcare Australia into its sister agency, Caritas Australia. This change was made to strengthen the capacity of Catholic Earthcare Australia, particularly in advocating and educating about the principles of Holy Father's 2015 encyclical, Laudato Si, and to achieve synergies with Caritas Australia's extensive education and advocacy work around Australia, including parishes, schools and the wider Catholic community on environmental issues such as climate change.

Mandate from the Australian Bishops
Tasks and Responsibilities
Catholic Earthcare Australia will act as an advisory agency to the BCJD on ecological matters, including the safeguarding of the integrity of creation, environmental justice and ecological sustainability.

Its tasks will include
 carrying out research, from the perspective of scripture and the Church's environmental and social justice teachings;
 developing national networks, with a view to initiating, linking, resourcing and supporting ecological endeavours within the Church, and extending the hand of friendship and cooperation to other like-minded groups working in the broader community;
 undertaking initiatives by encouraging a reverence for creation, a responsible stewardship of Earth's natural resources and ecosystems, and providing a voice for the victims of pollution, environmental degradation and injustice;
 providing educational materials and services to Catholic schools, organisations, congregations and parishes - particularly information to assist in the carrying out of environmental audits and the implementation of more ecologically and ethically sustainable practices.

References

External links
 Catholic Earthcare

Christianity and environmentalism
Catholic Church in Australia

Environmental education
Environmental organisations based in Australia